Thout 18 - Coptic Calendar - Thout 20

The nineteenth day of the Coptic month of Thout, the first month of the Coptic year. On a common year, this day corresponds to September 16, of the Julian Calendar, and September 29, of the Gregorian Calendar. This day falls in the Coptic season of Akhet, the season of inundation.

Commemorations

Feasts 
 The Feast of the Cross (Day 3)

Saints 
 The commemoration of the lifting up of Saint Gregory the Armenian from the pit

References 

Days of the Coptic calendar